Need for Speed: Hot Pursuit may refer to one of the following video games:

 Need for Speed III: Hot Pursuit, by EA Canada, released in 1998
 Need for Speed: Hot Pursuit 2, by EA Black Box, released in 2002
 Need for Speed: Hot Pursuit (2010 video game), by Criterion Games, released in 2010 
 Need for Speed: Hot Pursuit Remastered, a 2020 game in the Need for Speed franchise

See also
 Need for Speed (disambiguation)
 Hot pursuit (disambiguation)